Live at the Caravan of Dreams is a live album by American guitarist James Blood Ulmer recorded in 1985 at the Caravan of Dreams in Fort Worth, Texas, and released on the Caravan of Dreams label. It was Ulmer's only album recorded for the label.

Reception
The Allmusic review by Thom Jurek awarded the album 4 stars, and states, "Precision and dynamic create the drama on this set and, as it moves from one jam into another, a state of deep black and blue grace is achieved, making this a seductive, smoky, from the depths kind of record. This one is overlooked by critics but the reason why is baffling".

Track listing
All compositions by James Blood Ulmer
 " Are You Glad To Be In America?  4:28  
 "The Little Red House" - 4:34  
 "Cheering" - 4:43  
 "Recess" - 5:59  
 "Revealing" - 3:26  
 "Lonely Man" - 4:32  
 "Church" - 5:37  
 "I Need Love" - 4:06 
Recorded at the Caravan of Dreams, Fort Worth Texas in 1985

Personnel
James Blood Ulmer - guitar, vocals
Charles Burnham - violin
Amin Ali - bass
Warren Benbow - drums

References

Caravan of Dreams albums
James Blood Ulmer live albums
1986 live albums